Brotherly derby, also known as the Brotherly is the name given in football to any match between the men's national senior football team of Albania and Kosovo.

History

First match
The first match between these two teams took place on 29 November 1942. It was a friendly match as part of the celebrations for the thirtieth anniversary of the independence of Albania. The match ended with a 2–0 win for Tirana, and the starting line-ups of that match was:

Second match
50 years after the first match, the newly separated Football Federation of Kosovo from Football Association of Yugoslavia signed a cooperation protocol with the Albanian Football Association and in the framework of this protocol it was decided to play on 14 February a friendly match between these two national teams, and this match ended with a 3–1 win for Albania. The starting line-ups of that match was:

2002–2015
During the period 2002–2015, these national teams played a total of three friendly matches (two wins for Albania and a draw), the first match during this period took place on 7 September 2002 and this match ended with a 0–1 win for Albania. Eight years later, respectively on the second anniversary of Kosovo's independence, a match was played again between these two national teams and this match ended with a 2–3 win for Albania. The profits gathered from the match went to those affected by floods in Shkodër.

These national teams played a friendly match on 13 November 2015. Albania played this friendly after almost a month after beating Armenia in UEFA Euro 2016 qualifying which provided Albania with qualification for the first time to a major competition, UEFA Euro 2016. For Kosovo this match was among the few matches allowed by FIFA which would then be the last match before Kosovo's membership in UEFA, and FIFA. This match ended with a 2–2 draw, which was called a brotherly draw, where after this match officially all matches between the two national teams began to be called brotherly.

First official match
On 29 May 2018 the first official match was played between the two countries. This match took place on a neutral ground, in Letzigrund of Zürich. 18,700 fans mainly from the Albanian diaspora watched a 3–0 win for Kosovo, which was their first victory in history against Albania.

'Unnecessary friendly'
On 28 October 2020, the Football Federation of Kosovo confirmed that a friendly match against Albania on 11 November would be played before the last two UEFA Nations League matches as a substitute for Albania's canceled match against Gibraltar. However, this match was criticized as an "unnecessary friendly" by both managers Edoardo Reja and Bernard Challandes, as the match would be taking place at a crucial moment for both teams, with Albania needing to be prepared for their next two Nations League matches in order to secure the promotion from League B, while Kosovo was faced with a player shortage due to the COVID-19 pandemic and a poor Nations League performance which threatened to relegate the team from League D. Regardless, the friendly went ahead and ended with a 2–1 win for Albania.

Overall and matches

Overall

Matches

Records

Below are two lists of the top 11 players with the most appearances and goals in Brotherly derby.Players in bold are still active at international level.

Most appearances

Top goalscorers

Players who played for both senior national teams
During the period before 2016, these two national teams have exchanged players with each other, which influenced these two teams to be called reserve (B) teams of each other, Kosovo national team was called Albania B due to many players coming to play for Kosovo as they had no space to play for Albania, while Albania national team was called Kosovo B due to of the large number of players of Kosovo Albanian descent in its composition. These exchanges began to be called acts of treason after Kosovo's membership in UEFA and FIFA, where some Albania players of Kosovo Albanian descent such as Amir Rrahmani, Herolind Shala and Milot Rashica who were part of the plans for the future of the Albania, moved to Kosovo.

Players in bold are still active at international level with respective national teams.

Albania then Kosovo

Kosovo then Albania

See also

Albania–Kosovo relations

Notes

References

External links
Brotherly derby at RSSSF

International association football rivalries
football
Albania national football team rivalries
Kosovo national football team